This is the discography for American hip hop musician Mia X.

Albums

Studio albums

Extended plays

Mixtapes

Soundtrack albums

Compilation albums

Singles

As lead artist

A

As featured artist

Collaboration singles

References 

Discographies of American artists
Hip hop discographies